Fredersdorfer Mühlenfließ is a river of Brandenburg and Berlin, Germany. It flows into the Müggelsee, which is drained by the Spree, near Rahnsdorf.

See also
List of rivers of Brandenburg

External links

Rivers of Brandenburg
Rivers of Berlin
Rivers of Germany